Dunlap is a neighborhood in south Seattle, Washington, just north of Rainier Beach. It is home to Dunlap Elementary School, part of the Seattle Public Schools. Dunlap is named after Joseph Dunlap, the first homesteader in the area.

External links
Seattle City Clerk's Neighborhood Map Atlas — Dunlap

Rainier Beach, Seattle
Rainier Valley, Seattle